40 Cancri is a binary star system in the zodiac constellation of Cancer, located about 614 light years from the Sun in the Beehive Cluster (NGC 2632). It is a challenge to view with the naked eye, having an apparent visual magnitude of 6.61. The system is moving further from the Earth with a heliocentric radial velocity of 34 km/s.

The primary component appears to be a normal A-type main-sequence star with a stellar classification of A1 V, showing neither an organized magnetic field nor a chemical peculiarity. However, it has an excessive temperature for its luminosity, and thus is considered an extreme blue straggler. This is a second generation star formed through a collision of two low mass stars some 5–350 million years ago. The collision was either between two separate cluster members or the coalescence of a binary star system.

With an effective temperature of 9,382 K, this is the hottest star in the cluster by about 1,200 K. It has 2.46 times the mass of the Sun and 2.72 times the Sun's radius. The star has an unusually slow rotation for an A1V star, with a projected rotational velocity of 10 km/s. It is radiating 74 times the Sun's luminosity from its photosphere.

References

A-type main-sequence stars
Blue stragglers
Binary stars
Cancer (constellation)
Durchmusterung objects
Cancri, 40
073666
042523